Severo-Evensky District is an administrative and municipal district (raion), one of the eight in Magadan Oblast, Russia. It is located in the east of the oblast. Its administrative center is the urban locality (an urban-type settlement) of Evensk. Population:  3,744 (2002 Census);  The population of Evensk accounts for 67.3% of the district's total population.

Geography
The district is located in the area of the Kolyma Mountains.

References

Notes

Sources

Districts of Magadan Oblast